The Danish Men's Basketball Cup is the annual basketball cup competition held in Denmark for professional men's teams. The first season of the competition was played in 1975. Bakken Bears is the all-time record holder with 12 titles.

Finals

References

External links
Latest seasons at Flashscores

Basketball in Denmark
Basketball cup competitions in Europe